Saleem Asmi was a journalist who served as an editor of Dawn and Khaleej Times.

Biography
Asmi was born on 29 November 1934 in Jhansi, India. He attended and graduated from the University of Karachi with masters in English literature. After graduation, he joined Pakistan Times as a sub-editor. During the regime of Muhammad Zia-ul-Haq, he was imprisoned for criticising the government.

In 1988, he joined Dawn as a city editor. In March 2000, Asmi became the editor of Dawn. During his tenure as an editor of Dawn, he introduced two magazines, The Gallery and Books and Authors. He served as an editor until 2003 when he was removed from the position.

Saleem Asmi died in 2020 at the age of 85.

References

2020 deaths
Dawn (newspaper) editors
Pakistani journalists